Jalan Kubor Cemetery, (Malay: Perkuburan Jalan Kubor) sometimes called Victoria Street Cemetery, is a historical royal Muslim cemetery in Singapore's Kampong Glam neighbourhood.

History
In 1824, the land was ceded to the British by Hussein Shah, Sultan of Johor and Singapore, in what is now called the founding of modern Singapore. Five years later, in 1829, a colonial prospector named J. T. Thomson recorded the historical site as Tombs of the Malayan Princes, which is the name that appeared on a map by G. D. Coleman, published in Calcutta in 1836 and in London in 1839. Another name appearing on early maps is Sultan Keramat, meaning Sultan's Holy Grounds.

The cemetery features tombstones with inscriptions in a diversity of languages and writing systems, reflecting the indigenous peoples of Singapore, including Malay, Javanese script, Buginese Lontara script, Arabic, English, Mandarin and Gujarati.

In 1852, Syed Omar Aljunied donated the large plot of land as a waqf (inalienable charitable endowment) to be used as a Muslim burial ground under the trusteeship of his descendants. In 1987, Singapore Land Authority acquired ownership of the cemetery grounds. In 1998, Singapore's Urban Redevelopment Authority earmarked the site for residential redevelopment. In 2014 and 2015, a major research project led by Dr. Imran bin Tajudeen was commissioned by National Heritage Board, documenting the entire historical site.

Pioneers of Singapore

Key historical figures buried in Jalan Kubor Cemetery include descendants of Hussein Shah, Sultan of Johor and daerah Singapore:

 Tengku Haji Hussain Muazzam ll bin Tengku Haji Ali Iskandar Shah ll, great³-grandson of Sultan Haji Ahmad Hussein Muazzam Shah
 Tengku Haji Abdul Kadir bin Tengku Besar Haji Muhammad (JP)
 Tengku Hajjah Aisyah, (Tg Gedung) binte Sultan Haji Alauddin Alam Syah

Other prominent personalities include:
 Syed Haji Alwee bin Haji Ali Aljunied (JP)
 Haji Ambok Sooloh Bin Haji Omar, Buginese businessman and community leader
 Haji Osman Ambok Dalek Daeng Pasandrek bin Haji Ali, Buginese merchant
Haji Osman bin Abu Naim Banjar, Banjarese merchant

References
 
 
 
 
 

History of Singapore
Cemeteries in Singapore
Places in Singapore
Tourist attractions in Singapore